Ranatra montezuma is a species of waterscorpion in the family Nepidae. It is endemic to Montezuma Well in Yavapai County, Arizona, United States.

References

Insects described in 1976
Nepidae